Sir Jacob Charles Vouza, KPM (c. 1892 – 15 March 1984) was a native police officer of the British Solomon Islands Protectorate, who served with the United States Marine Corps in the Guadalcanal campaign during World War II.

Early life

Vouza was born in Tasimboko, Guadalcanal, Solomon Islands, and educated at the South Seas Evangelical Mission School there. In 1916 he joined the Solomon Islands Protectorate Armed Constabulary. He retired in 1941, after 25 years of service, at the rank of sergeant major.

World War II service

In mid-1942, Japanese forces invaded Guadalcanal. Vouza returned to active duty with the British forces and volunteered to work with the Coastwatchers. A Scotsman, Major Martin Clemens, a former British Solomon Islands Protectorate district officer, was the officer in charge of SgtMaj Vouza's brigade of native scouts. Vouza's ability as a scout had already been established when the US 1st Marine Division landed on Guadalcanal on 7 August 1942. That same day, Vouza rescued an aviator from USS Wasp who was shot down in Japanese-held territory. He guided the pilot to American lines, where he met the Marines for the first time.

Vouza then volunteered to scout behind enemy lines. On 20 August, while scouting for suspected Japanese outposts, Vouza was captured by men of the Ichiki Detachment, a battalion-strength force of the Japanese 28th Infantry Regiment. Having found a small American flag in Vouza's loincloth, the Japanese tied him to a tree and tortured him for information about Allied forces. Vouza was questioned for hours, but refused to talk. He was then bayoneted in both of his arms, throat, shoulder, face, and stomach, and left to die.

After his captors departed, he freed himself by chewing through the ropes with his teeth, and made his way through the miles of jungle to American lines. Before receiving medical attention, he gasped a warning to Martin Clemens and Lieutenant Colonel Edwin A. Pollock, whose 2nd Battalion 1st Marines held the defences at the Ilu River mouth. Vouza told him that an estimated 250 to 500 Japanese soldiers were coming to attack his position in any minute. This warning gave the Marines the brief but precious time of about 10 minutes to prepare their defences along the Ilu river. The subsequent Battle of the Tenaru was a clear victory for the Marines.

After spending 12 days in the hospital, Vouza returned to duty as the chief scout for the Marines. He accompanied Lieutenant Colonel Evans F. Carlson and the 2nd Raider Battalion on their 30-day raid behind enemy lines.

Awards

Vouza was highly decorated for his World War II service. The Silver Star was presented to him personally by Major General Alexander A. Vandegrift, commanding general of the 1st Marine Division, for refusing to give information under Japanese torture. In 1945, he also was awarded the Legion of Merit for outstanding service with the 2nd Raider Battalion during November and December 1942, and was made an honorary sergeant major in the Marine Corps. From the British government, Vouza received the George Medal (GM) for gallant conduct and exceptional devotion to duty, and the Police Long Service and Good Conduct Medal. In the 1957 New Year Honours, he furthermore was appointed a member of the Order of the British Empire (MBE) for public services in the British Solomon Islands Protectorate, and in the 1979 Birthday Honours promoted to a knight commander of the same order (KBE) for outstanding services to his country and local community.

After the war

After the war, Vouza continued to serve his fellow islanders. He was appointed district headman in 1949, and was president of the Guadalcanal Council from 1952 to 1958. He was a member of the British Solomon Islands Protectorate Advisory Council from 1950 to 1960.

He made many friends during his association with the Marine Corps, and Marines frequently visited him on Guadalcanal. In 1968, Vouza visited the United States as the honoured guest of the 1st Marine Division Association. He wore his Marine Corps tunic until his death on 15 March 1984, and was buried in it.

Memorial

A monument in his honour stands in front of the police headquarters building in Honiara, the capital of the Solomon Islands.

Further reading

 James, P. D. (2016). War at the End of the World: Douglas MacArthur and the Forgotten Fight For New Guinea, 1942-1945. New York: Penguin Books.
 Leckie, R. (1965). Challenge for the Pacific: Guadalcanal: The Turning Point of the War. London: Penguin Random House/Bantam Press.

 Toll, I. W. (2016). 'The Conquering Tide: War in the Pacific Islands, 1942-1944. New York: W. W. Norton & Company.

See also

 Coastwatchers
 Paul Mason (politician)
 William John Read

References

External links

 Video of Sir Jacob presenting a wreath on the US Bicentennial
  First Offensive: The Marine Campaign for Guadalcanal, Henry I. Shaw Jr. (biography of Jacob Vouza by Ann A. Ferrante)
 "Sir Jacob Vouza-Solomon Islands War Hero", Gina Maka'a, Solomon Times'', 22 September 2008

1890s births
1984 deaths
Recipients of the Silver Star
Foreign recipients of the Legion of Merit